Mariella Fasoula (born 2 September 1997) is a Greek basketball player for the CB Avenida and the Greek national team.

She participated at the EuroBasket Women 2017.

Personal
Her father is the former basketball player Panagiotis Fasoulas.

References

External links

Vanderbilt Commodores bio

1997 births
Boston College Eagles women's basketball players
Living people
Centers (basketball)
Greek expatriate basketball people in the United States
Greek women's basketball players
Basketball players from Athens
Power forwards (basketball)
Vanderbilt Commodores women's basketball players